No Surrender…No Retreat is the third album from the rapper Bushwick Bill, which he dedicated to Gil Epstein, a Fort Bend County prosecutor and friend who was gunned down in 1996, two years before the album's release.

Track listing 
Intro
5 Element Combat
2 Hard 2 Test 
In My Hood
My Bitch
All D. Freeman
Hood Rat
P. Funk  
Don't Be Afraid  
Tragedy
Let Da Rain Come Down  
Who's The Mack?  
Kaos Cidity 
Gangsta Funk   
Sa Fools 
3 Hard Headz 
Let's Give Love Another Try  
Stand By Me
Outro

Chart performance

References

1998 albums
Bushwick Bill albums
Rap-A-Lot Records albums